The 1950 NCAA baseball season, play of college baseball in the United States organized by the National Collegiate Athletic Association (NCAA) began in the spring of 1950.  The season progressed through the regular season and concluded with the 1950 College World Series.  The College World Series, held for the fourth time in 1950, consisted of one team from each of eight geographical districts and was held for the first time in Omaha, Nebraska at Johnny Rosenblatt Stadium as a double-elimination tournament.  Texas claimed their second championship.

Conference changes
Montana left the Pacific Coast Conference for the Mountain States Conference.  The PCC played as a 9-team league.

Conference winners
This is a partial list of conference champions from the 1950 season.  Each of the eight geographical districts chose, by various methods, the team that would represent them in the NCAA Tournament.  Conference champions had to be chosen, unless all conference champions declined the bid.

Conference standings
The following is an incomplete list of conference standings:

College World Series

The 1950 season marked the fourth NCAA Baseball Tournament, which consisted of the eight team College World Series.  For the first time, the College World Series was held in Omaha, Nebraska, which became the permanent home of the event.  Districts used a variety of selection methods to the event, from playoffs to a selection committee.  District playoffs were not considered part of the NCAA Tournament, and the expansion to eight teams resulted in the end of regionals as they existed from 1947 through 1949.  The eight teams played a double-elimination format, with Texas claiming their second championship with a 3–0 win over Washington State in the final.

Award winners

All-America team

References